Accident 703 is a 1962 Spanish drama film directed by José María Forqué and written by Vicente Coello.

Release
The film was released on 6 August 1962 in Spain and was released later in Argentina.

Cast

 Manuel Alexandre
 Ángel Álvarez
 Carlos Ballesteros
 Vicente Bañó
 Maite Blasco
 Frank Braña
 Ángela Bravo
 José María Caffarel
 Susana Campos
 Ricardo Canales
 Antonio Casas
 Antonio Cerro
 Enrique Closas
 Carlos Cores
 Francisco Cornet
 Miguel Ángel de la Iglesia ....  child
 Antonio Delgado
 Alejo del Peral
 Hebe Donay
 Enrique Echevarría
 Irán Eory
 Carlos Estrada
 Pedro Fenollar
 Lola Gálvez
 Gemma García
 Tito García
 Manolo Gómez Bur
 Julia Gutiérrez Caba
 Jesús Guzmán
 Lolita Herrera
 Guillermo Hidalgo
 Maribel Hidalgo
 Rufino Inglés
 María Luisa Lamata
 José Luis López Vázquez
 Carmen Lozano
 Jacinto Martín
 Maribel Martín ....  child
 José Morales
 Guadalupe Muñoz Sampedro
 José Orjas
 Rosa Palomar  (as Rosita Palomar)
 Erasmo Pascual
 Jesús Puente
 Elisa Romay
 Concha Sánchez
 Ángel Terrón
 Nuria Torray
 Ana María Ventura
 José Villasante

External links
 

1962 films
1960s Spanish-language films
Spanish drama films
Argentine drama films
Films about automobiles
Films directed by José María Forqué
1960s Argentine films
1960s Spanish films